State Route 91 (SR 91) is a short state highway in southwestern Maine.

Route description
SR 91 begins at an intersection with U.S. Route 1 (US 1) in York. The highway proceeds out of town to the northwest towards South Berwick, just nicking the corner of Eliot along the way. The first  of the route follow the York River towards South Berwick. SR 91 passes under Interstate 95 (the Maine Turnpike) without an interchange, then has its northern terminus at SR 236.

Junction list

References

091
Transportation in York County, Maine
York, Maine
South Berwick, Maine